Nickerson Field is an outdoor athletic stadium in the Northeastern United States, on the campus of Boston University (BU) in Boston, Massachusetts. The stadium is owned by BU, and is the home field for some Boston University Terriers athletics programs, including soccer and lacrosse. It was also the home of the Boston University Terriers football team until the program was discontinued following the 1997 season.

The stadium is located on the site of Braves Field, the former home ballpark of the Boston Braves, a major league baseball team in the National League; the franchise relocated to Milwaukee in March 1953, and relocated again in 1966, becoming the Atlanta Braves. Parts of Braves Field, such as the entry gate and right field pavilion, remain as portions of the current stadium. The old Braves Field ticket office at Harry Agganis Way also remains, now used by the Boston University Police Department. The stadium has been the home of BU teams longer (50-plus years) than it was the home of the Braves (parts of 38 seasons).

The field is named for William Emery Nickerson (1853–1930), a partner of King C. Gillette during the early years of the Gillette Safety Razor Company.

History
The university's previous athletic field was in the town of Weston. That field had been named for Nickerson, a member of the BU board of trustees who had donated funds for the facilities in Weston in 1926. Nickerson "was an MIT graduate who was the principal inventor of the machinery used to manufacture the first Gillette safety razor." The first Nickerson Field was dedicated on October 6, 1928, with a game against the New Hampshire Wildcats.

BU purchased the former home of the Braves on July 30, 1953, and in April 1954 renamed it Boston University Field. In 1955, the left field pavilion and the "Jury Box" were demolished and in November, 1959, the grandstand was taken down to make room for three high rise dormitories that were completed in 1964. The existing right field pavilion was squared off on the west side and filled in on the east side where a section had been removed to accommodate the Braves Field right field foul pole and bullpens. The three dormitories overlooking the field coincidentally suggest the outline of the original main grandstand section.

In February 1956, BU was awarded $391,000 for the Weston field, which had been taken by eminent domain for construction of Massachusetts Route 128. BU used the proceeds, in part, to renovate the former baseball park, and on September 28, 1963, renamed it Nickerson Field, inheriting the name of the prior field in Weston.

In 1968, the field underwent a renovation.  The four Braves Field light towers were dismantled. That year, BU became the second college in the United States to install AstroTurf.  The following year, not only did the BU football team practice on that field, so did the Boston College Eagles football team and the Boston Patriots.  Both used the field to prepare for away games they would play on AstroTurf fields.

During the 1983 season, Nickerson Field was the home field of the Boston Breakers of the United States Football League. From the mid-1980s to 1995, the stadium hosted the New England Scholastic Band Association's marching band field show championships. In 1989, to accommodate commencement speakers U.S. President George H. W. Bush and French President François Mitterrand, a large platform was constructed to Secret Service specifications on one side of the field. In 2001, the antiquated turf was replaced with a newer, more player-friendly artificial surface (FieldTurf) as part of a deal with the Women's United Soccer Association to host the Boston Breakers games.  With a professional soccer team playing at Nickerson the football lines, which had remained on the field even though BU no longer had a football program, were not repainted. The platform built for Bush and Mitterrand was removed during the summer of 2008, when the field was expanded and resurfaced.

In the summer of 2015, the field received a new artificial turf, GreenFields MX Trimension; the new surface was installed over a period of five weeks, covering .

Use by professional sports
Since its reconfiguration in the 1950s, multiple professional sports franchises have used the stadium:

 The Tea Men used Nickerson after Foxboro Raceway filed a temporary restraining order preventing them from using Schaefer Stadium.
 The 2004 and 2005 Major League Lacrosse championships were played at the stadium.

References

Further reading
 

Boston Cannons venues
Boston University Terriers football
Boston University Terriers sports venues
College football venues
American Football League venues
American football venues in Boston
Defunct American football venues in Massachusetts
Defunct sports venues in Boston
Lacrosse venues in Massachusetts
College field hockey venues in the United States
Boston Patriots (AFL) stadiums
United States Football League venues
Defunct National Football League venues
Soccer venues in Massachusetts
College soccer venues in the United States
Rugby league stadiums in the United States
Rugby league in Massachusetts
Sports venues completed in 1915
Boston Minutemen
North American Soccer League (1968–1984) stadiums
1915 establishments in Massachusetts